Joan or Johan Huydecoper van Maarsseveen (1599–1661) was an important merchant, financial expert, property developer active in Amsterdam. He took over the family tannery, pelt and armament trading business. He was a director of the Dutch East India Company, the consolidated Dutch trading company founded by the government of the Dutch Republik. During the Dutch Golden Age, the republican minded Huydecoper belonged to the Dutch States Party and was six times mayor of Amsterdam and was knighted lord of Maarsseveen. He was one of the initiators of the construction of the new town hall of Amsterdam and was a prominent patron of the arts and art collector.

Life 
Joan was born in Amsterdam as the son of Jan Jacobsz. Huydecoper (1540-1624). The Dutch-language name Huydecoper means 'buyer of pelts'. His father was a tanner and pelt trader in Amsterdam and held positions as counsel and aldermen of Amsterdam.  In 1602, he was one of the first investors in the Dutch East India Company. In 1616 he owned shares in the Magelhaense Compagnie (Magellan Company), which traded with South America. He invested in property all over the city, but especially on Uilenburg, behind his house. In 1622 he bought a lot in the Jordaan, where he had seven houses built, three of which along the Lauriergracht. 

Joan Huydecoper had an important political career: first, as a protégé of burgomaster Jacob Dircksz de Graeff, he was elected to the vroedschap of Amsterdam in 1631. He was six times a mayor of Amsterdam. Johan Huydecoper was an important patron and collector of art. He is mentioned as the first person in Amsterdam, who bought a painting from Rembrandt. Huydecoper and Rembrandt probably met each other at an early stage, as they both lived in the Sint Antoniesbreestraat. Huydecoper became a connoisseur of fine arts and was friendly with Jan Vos (poet), who praised his house and collection of paintings in several poems, one on a painting by Rubens. In 1639, Philip Vingboons designed his mansion on Singel; the house was destroyed in 1943 when two English planes collided in midair and one came down on the house. (One of the few spots in Amsterdam that were damaged during the Second World War). 

Huydecoper was also a real-estate developer along the river Vecht (Utrecht), where he had his country house. Gary Schwartz wrote: "What art could contribute to Maarsseveen: architecture to beautify it, map-making to advertise it, and poetry to immortalise it. He used the patronage he wielded in Amsterdam to put artists scholars, and publishers to work for him in Maarsseveen". In 1650, Huydecoper had the gates closed, the bridges lifted, and the city protected, when William II of Orange tried to attack Amsterdam. He was involved in the building and decoration of the new city hall on Dam Square. 

During his office as a burgomaster, he chose the side of Cornelis de Graeff and made several diplomatic trips; in 1653 he went to Lübeck and he represented the city in 1655 at the baptism of the son of Frederick William of Brandenburg, and in 1660 at the coronation of Charles II of England. 

Huydecoper symbolises the prosperity of Amsterdam during the Golden Age and managed to unify wealth, politics, and the cultural elite status in Amsterdam. He was the father of burgomaster Joan Huydecoper II and father-in-law of Jan J. Hinlopen, an art collector.

Sources

External links

1599 births
1661 deaths
Mayors of Amsterdam
17th-century Dutch businesspeople
17th-century Dutch politicians
17th-century Dutch diplomats
Businesspeople from Amsterdam
Burials at the Oude Kerk, Amsterdam